Mohammed Al Kuwari (Arabic: محمد الكواري) (born 23 March 1992) is a Qatari footballer.

External links
 
 Mohammed Al Kuwari - KOOORA.com

Qatari footballers
1992 births
Living people
Al-Arabi SC (Qatar) players
Qatar Stars League players
Association football midfielders